The 2010–11 Nemzeti Bajnokság I was the sixtieth edition of the top level championship in the Hungarian team handball for women. The regular season started on 2 September 2010 with a clash between UKSE Szekszárd and defending champions Győri Audi ETO KC, and ended on 27 March 2011, also including Győr, this time as hosts against Újbuda TC. The postseason began on 7 April 2011 and was concluded on 21 May 2011 with the final round classification groups. Győri Audi ETO KC went on to win all of their playoff matches and took their fourth consecutive title and eighth overall.

Overview

Teams
A total of twelve teams will contest the league, including nine sides from the 2009–10 Nemzeti Bajnokság I and three promoted teams from the 2009–10 Nemzeti Bajnokság I/B. Although officially only two clubs got relegated, ASA-Consolis Hódmezővásárhelyi NKC went close to bankruptcy and were unable to meet demands to enter the new season. All their players could and have moved away freely, and so did some quality youth prospects as well. In this situation the board adjudged there is not a long-term perspective to run the club and decided not to enter the championship and to cease the club. Since then, the handball in Hódmezővásárhely is represented by grassroot team Hódmezővásárhelyi Leány Kézilabda Club.

After the decision of pulling out, the Hungarian Handball Federation asked UKSE Szekszárd, the third-best team in the NB I/B last season (the second team of Győri Audi ETO KC finished ahead of them, but according to the rules they can not play in the same division as their parent team), whether they have the financial background and are able to join the league. They met all the criteria and replaced Hódmezővásárhelyi NKC not long before the new season began.

Other two dropped teams, Kiskunhalas NKSE-Bravotel and Hunnia KSK had an everyday fight for the survive, and it stamped their performances: both of them achieved only a single win during the regular season and were unable to improve in the postseason thus fallen out hopeless.

Beside the unexpected promotion of UKSE Szekszárd the two winners of NB I/B have climbed into the top division: ÉTV-Érdi VSE from the Western Group with an impressive 25-1-0 balance and Bugyi SE-Újbuda from the Eastern Group. The latter one moved from Bugyi to Budaörs and later to Újbuda, changing their name simply to Újbuda TC for the new season.

Last year's league champions Győri Audi ETO KC and silver medallists DVSC-Korvex compete in the 2010–11 EHF Champions League, while Budapest Bank-Békéscsabai Előre NKSE alongside SYMA Váci NKSE enter the 2010–11 EHF Cup. Despite lost to Győr in the Hungarian Cup final, Ferencvárosi TC advanced to the 2010–11 EHF Cup Winners' Cup as ETO already secured a Champions League spot.

Sponsorship changes

Five out of the twelve NBI teams have signed new name sponsorship deals for the new season. Just after the end of the 2009–2010 season, on 2 June 2010, Váci NKSE club director András Németh announced in a press conference, that from the next year the team will compete under the name SYMA Váci NKSE after their new sponsor. Mobile phone distributor RightPhone, which have been under contract with Ferencváros last year, have agreed a one-year deal with Alcoa FKC thus changing club name to Alcoa FKC RightPhone. Budapest Bank, patronizing the Hungarian handball since years, have tightened the relationship with Békéscsaba and became their main financial supporter. Dunaújváros, which have faced the threat of dissolution two years ago, secured a one-year deal with Regale Klímatechnika Kft., altering their name to Dunaúvárosi Regale Klíma.

From 2 October 2010 Ferencváros were known as FTC-Jógazdabank by signing a contract with Jógazda Szövetkezeti Takarékpénztár. The financial company stated, that their long-term plan is to "make Ferencváros a dominant team both in domestic and international level." However, it came like a bolt from the blue, when on 3 January 2011, just two months after the sponsoring contract was signed, the Hungarian Financial Supervisory Authority reported that they have revoked the license of the bank and simultaneously have initiated the liquidation process. As board president Zsolt Ákos Jeney revealed, by losing their name sponsor they count with a loss of a staggering 25 percent of their planned budget. He added also, that the management immediately held talks with other sponsors, which ensured them of their support and even backed the idea to increase their financial contribution in the future.

Meanwhile, the club management was also looking for a new sponsor, which they found in a relatively short time: Ferencvárosi TC have called a press conference for 3 February 2011, where they announced Rail Cargo Hungaria Zrt. as their new naming sponsor. Imre Kovács, CEO of the rail logistics company, have stated that social responsibility is an integral part their policy and they are ready to support the development of valuable communities with financial injections. Under the terms of agreement, the club has been renamed to FTC-Rail Cargo Hungaria.

Siófok KC, that already began to prepare for the next season, agreed a sponsorship contract with Galerius Wellness and Spa Center on 5 May 2011. As a result, the team wear the name of the bath and compete under the name Siófok KC-Galerius Fürdő until 31 December 2011.

Arenas and locations

Regular season

Results

League table

Individual statistics

Top scorers

Worst disciplines

Team statistics

Overall
Most wins – Győri Audi ETO KC (22)
Fewest wins – Újbuda TC and UKSE Szekszárd (1)
Most losses – Újbuda TC and UKSE Szekszárd (21)
Fewest losses – Győri Audi ETO KC (0)
Most goals scored – Győri Audi ETO KC (757)
Fewest goals scored – Újbuda TC (486)
Most goals conceded – UKSE Szekszárd (772)
Fewest goals conceded – Győri Audi ETO KC (493)
Best goal difference - Győri Audi ETO KC (+264)
Worst goal difference - Újbuda TC (−253)

Home
Most wins – Győri Audi ETO KC (11)
Fewest wins – Újbuda TC and UKSE Szekszárd (1)
Most losses – Újbuda TC and UKSE Szekszárd (10)
Fewest losses – Győri Audi ETO KC (0)
Most goals scored – SYMA Váci NKSE (388)
Fewest goals scored – Újbuda TC (246)
Most goals conceded – UKSE Szekszárd (365)
Fewest goals conceded – Győri Audi ETO KC (253)

Away
Most wins – Győri Audi ETO KC (11)
Fewest wins – Újbuda TC and UKSE Szekszárd (0)
Most losses – Újbuda TC and UKSE Szekszárd (11)
Fewest losses – Győri Audi ETO KC (0)
Most goals scored – Győri Audi ETO KC (377)
Fewest goals scored – Újbuda TC (240)
Most goals conceded – UKSE Szekszárd (407)
Fewest goals conceded – Győri Audi ETO KC (240)

Scoring
Widest winning margin: 27 goals –
Dunaújvárosi Regale Klíma 46–19 Újbuda TC (15 September 2010)
FTC-Rail Cargo Hungaria 44–17 Újbuda TC (17 November 2010)
Siófok KC-Galerius Fürdő 14–41 Győri Audi ETO KC (24 March 2011)
Most goals in a match: 77 goals –
FTC-Rail Cargo Hungaria 44–33 UKSE Szekszárd (2 February 2011)
Fewest goals in a match: 43 goals –
Budapest Bank-Békécsabai Előre NKSE 21–22 DVSC-Korvex (8 September 2010)
SYMA Váci NKSE 26–17 FTC-Rail Cargo Hungaria (28 December 2010)
Újbuda TC 19–24 Dunaújvárosi Regale Klíma (22 January 2011)
Most goals scored by losing team: 34 goals –
Alcoa FKC RightPhone 35–34 SYMA Váci NKSE (5 March 2011)
Veszprém Barabás KC 34–37 FTC-Rail Cargo Hungaria (8 September 2010)
Most goals scored in a match by one player: 15 goals –
Bojana Radulovics for Dunaújvárosi Regale Klíma against Alcoa FKC RightPhone (2 October 2010)
Kristina Trishchuk for Alcoa FKC RightPhone against Veszprém Barabás KC (28 December 2010)

Postseason

Classification round 9–12
Teams finished in bottom four positions after the regular season enter the classification round for 9–12 places, where a double round-robin system is used. In addition, they are given bonus points depending on their final ranking in the league phase of the championship. Érd, which took the ninth spot, were given four points, tenth placed Siófok were awarded three, Újbuda TC took two points while last placed UKSE Szekszárd got one point. Clubs with the two lowest combined points get relegated.

Results

Table

Additional points that were awarded after the final positions in the regular season are indicated in bonus points column.

Classification round 5–8
Similarly to the classification round of 9–12, the teams play twice against each other, on a home and on an away leg. Furthermore, they are rewarded with bonus points that are added to the points they win in the postseason and their combined total points decide the final ranking.

Results

Table

Additional points that were awarded after the final positions in the regular season are indicated in the bonus points column.

Championship playoff
Győri Audi ETO KC were proved invincible in the regular season once again and thus deservedly took the top spot of the championship playoff, having been drawn together with SYMA Váci NKSE, that finished in fourth position. Meanwhile, FTC-Rail Cargo Hungaria secured the second place after a hard-fought final day victory over Vác, which was just enough to end the regular season one point ahead of DVSC-Korvex, against them they begin the playoff campaign, where a best-of-three knockout is used. If a match ends with a draw, instead of playing extra time halves, the winner is decided by penalty shootout.

Bracket

Semifinals

Győri Audi ETO KC vs. SYMA Váci NKSE

Győri Audi ETO KC won series 2–0

FTC-Rail Cargo Hungaria vs. DVSC-Korvex

DVSC-Korvex won series 2–1

Third place playoffs

FTC-Rail Cargo Hungaria won series 2–0

Finals

Győri Audi ETO KC won series 2–0

Final standing

References

External links
 Worldhandball – IT help
 Hungarian Handball Federation official website

Nemzeti Bajnokság I (women's handball)
2010–11 domestic handball leagues
Nemzeti Bajnoksag I Women